UFC Primetime is a television series that aired on FX in the United States. The show chronicles the training regimens of two UFC fighters prior to their next upcoming main event bout.

Premise
Each season consists of three episodes with 30-minute running times (including commercials) that showcase opposing UFC mixed martial artists in their training camps as they make final preparations in getting ready—both mentally and physically—leading up to their big match.

UFC Primetime has drawn comparisons to HBO Sport's 24/7 highly acclaimed TV series, which shows the preparations of two boxers before a big event.

List of seasons

TV Ratings
An industry source told MMAjunkie ESPN2 scored 144,000 viewers for the 11 p.m. replay and 105,000 viewers for the 11:30 p.m. airing. The debut episode of "UFC Primetime" scored 610,000 viewers on Spike TV. In addition to ESPN2, replays have aired on ION Television, Fuel TV and Versus.

References

American sports television series
Ultimate Fighting Championship television series